Thomas Lennox may refer to:

 Tom Lennox, a character on the TV series 24
 Thomas Herbert Lennox (1869–1934), Ontario lawyer and political figure